Steamboat Ditch is a roughly 34-mile-long irrigation canal dug in the late 1870s by Chinese laborers. It begins at the Nevada and California state line and joins Steamboat Creek in south Reno.

Geography
This irrigation canal and adjoining access road is relatively flat with a slight declining grade of about 1/660  from its origin. The vast majority of the ditch is open earth and flanked by various specious of vegetation. The access road or "trail" flanking the canal is predominately dirt.

History
In 1877, the Truckee & Steamboat Irrigating Canal Company was organized to construct the Steamboat Ditch (Townley 1983: 13 7-138). Upon completion, it was the longest and most complicated ditch in the Truckee Meadows area. The total length of the ditch is 3348 miles in length, depending on the source (cf., Angel 1958:634; Townley 1983: 138).

According to the Territorial Enterprise (17 May 1878:2), the ditch company awarded the construction contract to the Chinese firm Quong Yee Wo & Company of San Francisco, California, with a bid of $36,000. Other bidders included Chinese and European-American firms (Territorial Enterprise 17 May 1878:2). A conflicting report states that the San Francisco-based firm Lung Chung & Company received the contract to construct the ditch.

At the start of construction in 1878, 115 Chinese laborers were employed, including approximately six European-American supervisors (Territorial Enterprise 24 August 1878:2; Townley 1983:138). The following year, the number of men increased to between 150 and 200 Chinese, with additional workmen expected. Due to incidental expenses, projected construction costs increased to $40,000. By that time, construction had progressed 10 miles from the ditch's head on the Truckee River. When completed, the ditch would terminate between Brown's Station and Steamboat Springs in south Truckee Meadows (Territorial Enterprise 1 March 1879:2).

Due to frozen ground in Verdi, west of Reno, the projected construction period was increased and the contract period extended for an additional two months to 1 August 1879. A contemporary news report claimed, "This ditch is one of the largest and most important of the entire system of irrigation of Washoe County" (Territorial Enterprise 3 July 1879:3). Angel (1958:634) states the Steamboat Ditch was not completed until 1880, at a cost of more than $50,000. Townley (1983:138) provides an estimated price of $40,000. He also notes the winter of 18789 was particularly hard, requiring the use of dynamite in places. The Steamboat Canal was formally opened on July 1, 1880.

In 1885, the Truckee & Steamboat Springs Irrigation Canal came into financial trouble, eventually selling its holdings via auction in 1886. For the sum of $15,750, which covered the amount due, John C. Hampton was granted the sale by J. T. Emmitt, Sheriff of Washoe County, who conducted the auction on 10 February 1886. Hampton served as the executor of C. P. Hubbell, deceased, in the case involving the Steamboat Ditch. It was heard in the Seventh Judicial District Court of Nevada, which ordered the sale. The plaintiff in the case was George M. Mapes. The other defendants, besides Hubbell, included J.P. Foulks. The ditch was described as beginning 4 miles south of Verdi at the border of California and Nevada and continuing 31.25 miles to end approximately 2 miles from Steamboat Springs. All the water rights, privileges and easements of the ditch were included in the sale (Washoe County Records, Deeds Book 11 :398-400).

Ownership
The Steamboat Canal and adjacent access road are now of mixed ownership among private landowners, homeowner associations, public utilities, private corporations, and state, city, county, and federal governments. The Steamboat Canal & Irrigation Co. has an irrigation easement to transport water through the ditch during the growing season.

Recreational use
Large sections of the access road have remained open to the public since the canal's construction and have come to act as a de facto trail and urban green space. It is used by runners, walkers, bicycle riders, dog walkers, and bird watchers on a daily basis. However, owners of portions of the access road have for decades prohibited public access to their private property.

Ecology

Observed species
Hundreds of plant and animal species have been observed along the Steamboat Ditch Trail. The ditch serves as an important water source during the summer months, when it carries irrigation water through the relatively inhospitable northwestern Great Basin Desert climate.

Birds

Mallard, Anas platyrhynchos
Gadwall, Mareca strepera
Song sparrow, Melospiza melodia
Yellow-rumped warbler, Setophaga coronata
Black-headed grosbeak, Pheucticus melanocephalus
Black-chinned hummingbird, Archilochus alexandri 
Violet-green swallow, Tachycineta thalassina
Tree swallow, Tachycineta bicolor
Yellow warbler, Setophaga petechia
Bullock's oriole, Icterus galbula
Red-winged blackbird, Agelaius phoeniceus
Western tanager, Piranga ludoviciana
Wilson's warbler, Cardellina pusilla
Cliff swallow, Petrochelidon pyrrhonota
Hermit thrush, Catharus guttatus
Belted kingfisher, Megaceryle alcyon
Bewick's wren, Thryomanes bewickii
Black-billed magpie, Pica hudsonia
Cedar waxwing, Bombycilla cedrorum
Bushtit, Psaltriparus minimus
California quail, Callipepla californica
White-crowned sparrow, Zonotrichia leucophrys
Golden-crowned sparrow, Zonotrichia atricapilla
Dark-eyed junco, Junco hyemalis
Mountain chickadee, Poecile gambeli
Townsend's solitaire, Myadestes townsendi
Spotted towhee, Pipilo maculatus
American robin, Turdus migratorius
California scrub jay, Aphelocoma californica
Common raven, Corvus corax
Great horned owl, Bubo virginianus
Barn owl, Tyto alba
Cooper's hawk, Accipiter cooperii
Sharp-shinned hawk, Accipiter striatus
Rufous hummingbird, Selasphorus rufus
Anna's hummingbird, Calypte anna
Broad-tailed hummingbird, Selasphorus platycercus
Orange-crowned warbler, Leiothlypis celata
Barn swallow, Hirundo rustica
Red-tailed hawk, Buteo jamaicensis
Northern flicker, Colaptes auratus
House wren, Troglodytes aedon
Lesser goldfinch, Spinus psaltria
American goldfinch, Spinus tristis
Pine siskin, Spinus pinus
Ruby-crowned kinglet, Corthylio calendula
Steller's jay, Cyanocitta stelleri
American kestrel, Falco sparverius
Peregrine falcon, Falco peregrinus
Merlin, Falco columbarius
Red-breasted sapsucker, Sphyrapicus ruber
Red-naped sapsucker, Sphyrapicus nuchalis
Mourning dove, Zenaida macroura
Eurasian collared dove, Streptopelia decaocto
House finch, Haemorhous mexicanus
Cassin's finch, Haemorhous cassinii
Downy woodpecker, Picoides pubescens
Red breasted nuthatch, Sitta canadensis
Say's phoebe, Sayornis saya
Brewer's blackbird, Euphagus cyanocephalus
Northern mockingbird, Mimus polyglottos
European starling, Sturnus vulgaris

Butterflies

Sylvan hairstreak, Satyrium sylvinum
Behr's hairstreak, Satyrium behrii
Juniper hairstreak, Callophrys gryneus
Lorquin's admiral, Limenitis lorquini
Monarch butterfly, Danaus plexippus
Mourning cloak butterfly, Nymphalis antiopa
Western tiger swallowtail, Papilio rutulus
Mylitta crescent, Phyciodes mylitta
Common checkered skipper, Pyrgus communis
Gray hairstreak, Strymon melinus
Pygmy blue butterfly, Brephidium exile
Orange sulfur butterfly, Colias eurytheme
Woodland skipper, Ochlodes sylvanoides
Great Basin wood-nymph, Cercyonis sthenele
Fiery skipper, Hylephila phyleus
Sachem skipper, Atalopedes campestris
Cabbage white butterfly, Pieris rapae
California tortoiseshell, Nymphalis californica
Painted lady butterfly, Vanessa cardui

Bees and other insects

Mining bees, Andrena
Blue milkweed beetle, Chrysochus cobaltinus
Milkweed beetles, Tetraopes
Long horned bees, Melissodes
Bumblebees, Bombus
Honeybees, Apis mellifera
Convergent ladybug, Hippodamia convergens

Reptiles and amphibians

Sierra chorus frog, Pseudacris sierra
Terrestrial garter snake, Thamnophis elegans
Western fence lizard, Sceloporus occidentalis
North American racer, Coluber constrictor
Gopher snake, Pituophis catenifer
Rubber boa, Charina bottae
Western toad, Bufo boreas

Mammals

Montane vole, Microtus montanus
Coyote, Canis latrans
Bobcat, Lynx rufus
Black bear, Ursus americanus
Mule deer, Odocoileus hemionus
California ground squirrel, Otospermophilus beecheyi
Grey squirrel, Sciurus griseus
Least chipmunk, Tamias minimus
American deer mouse, Peromyscus maniculatus
Desert woodrat, Neotoma lepida
Desert cottontail, Sylvilagus audubonii

Trees and shrubs

Fremont cottonwood, Populus fremontii
Mountain alder, Alnus incana subsp. tenuifolia
Coyote willow, Salix exigua
Yellow willow, Salix lutea
Wood's rose, Rosa woodsii
California mugwort, Artemisia douglasiana
Common mugwort, Artemisia ludoviciana
Chokecherry, Prunus virginiana
Jeffrey pine, Pinus jeffreyi
Curl-leaf mountain mahogany, Cercocarpus ledifolius
Antelope bitterbrush, Purshia tridentata
Desert peach, Prunus andersonii
Pinyon pine, Pinus monophylla
Green ephedra, Ephedra viridis
Wyoming sagebrush, Artemisia tridentata var. wyomingensis
Rubber rabbitbrush, Ericameria nauseosa

Wildflowers and grasses

Narrowleaf milkweed, Asclepias fascicularis
Showy milkweed, Asclepias speciosa
Soft rush, Juncus effusus
Baltic rush, Juncus balticus
Bulrush, Scirpus
Hooker's evening primrose, Oenothera elata
Velvety goldenrod, Solidago velutina
Western goldenrod, Solidago lepida
Western goldentop, Euthamia occidentalis
Creeping wildrye, Leymus triticoides
Smoothstem blazingstar, Mentzelia laevicaulis
Daggerpod, Phoenicaulis cheiranthoides
Woolypod milkvetch, Astragalus purshii
Nevada pea, Lathyrus lanszwertii
Palmer's penstemon, Penstemon palmeri
Roezeli's penstemon, Penstemon roezlii
Prickly poppy, Argemone munita
Dusty maiden, Chaenactis douglasii
Great Basin wild rye, Leymus cinereus
Squirrel tail, Elymus elymoides
Veatches' blazingstar, Mentzelia veatchina
Indian rice grass, Achnatherum hymenoides

References

Irrigation canals
Geography of Reno, Nevada
History of Reno, Nevada
 
Deserts of Nevada